Cantharellus enelensis is one of several species of chanterelle native to North America. It is a new member of the C. cibarius complex and wasn't discovered until 2017. Chanterelles identified with DNA sequencing as C. enelensis have been found in Newfoundland, Quebec, Michigan and Illinois but there is evidence to suggest it is widespread in North American conifer forests. It has been temporarily categorized as having a conservation status of 'least concern'. Members of the C. cibarius complex in eastern North America are difficult to distinguish from one another without special techniques such as DNA sequencing and microscopic examinations. C. enelensis is the most commonly found chanterelle in Newfoundland. C. enelensis is one of 40 varieties of Cantharellus that grows in North America.

Etymology 
The name enelensis is in honour of the Canadian province of Newfoundland and Labrador where the mushroom was first discovered.

Description 
Cantharellus enelensis has decurrent ridges that are forked, a cap that is from 2.5-11cm in diameter and can be infundibuliform in older specimens. The flesh is firm and white to pale yellow on the inside and can smell fruity, often described as apricot smelling.  The foot of the mushroom gets wider closer to the cap.

Cantharellus. enelensis can be distinguished from C. cibarius by its hymenophore, which is more orange in C. enelensis.

Ecology 
Cantharellus enelensis forms mycorrhizal relationships and grows in conifer forests with well drained, moist, sandy soil.

The mushrooms beat fruiting bodies between July and September with the peak in August.

Edibility 
Cantharellus enelensis mushrooms are considered a choice edible mushroom.

References 

Fungi of North America
Fungi described in 2017
Edible fungi
enelensis